Highway 951 is a provincial highway in the north-west region of the Canadian province of Saskatchewan. It runs from Highway 941 to Highway 903.

The first 5 km of Highway 951 lies within the borders of the Meadow Lake Provincial Park.

See also 
Roads in Saskatchewan
Transportation in Saskatchewan

References 

951